is a 2012 anime series adapted from the manga of the same name by Yuki Kodama. It is directed by Shinichirō Watanabe, with music by Yoko Kanno; it is the third collaboration between Watanabe and Kanno, following Macross Plus (1994-1995) and Cowboy Bebop (1998). The series follows Kaoru Nishimi, an intelligent, introverted first-year high school student from a wealthy family who moves cities frequently as a result of his father's career. He has consequently never made lasting friendships, but discovers jazz music after meeting classmates Sentarō Kawabuchi and Ritsuko Mukae.

The series was produced by MAPPA and Tezuka Productions, and aired on Fuji TV's Noitamina programming block. In North America, Kids on the Slope was licensed by Sentai Filmworks and aired on the streaming service Crunchyroll, which simulcast the series during its original broadcast run.

Episodes

References

External links
Official anime website

Kids on the Slope